Johann Garreis (born 18 February 1925) is a German former sports shooter. He competed in the 50 metre pistol event at the 1964 Summer Olympics.

References

External links
 

1925 births
Possibly living people
German male sport shooters
Olympic shooters of the United Team of Germany
Shooters at the 1964 Summer Olympics
People from Meissen (district)
Sportspeople from Saxony